Kevin Blackwell (born 1958) is an English football goalkeeper, coach and manager.

Kevin Blackwell may also refer to:
 Kevin Blackwell (politician) (born 1954), American politician from Mississippi
 Kevin Blackwell (cyclist) (–1980), New Zealand cyclist